Giacone is an Italian surname. Notable people with the surname include:

Marc Giacone (born 1954), Monacan composer, organist, and improviser
Giovanni Giacone (1900–1964), Italian footballer

See also
Colle Giacone, a comune in Umbria, Italy

Italian-language surnames